William Goronwy Griffiths. He was born and lives on Long Island, New York. Author of award winning books including Malchus, Driven, Takedown, Stingers, Talons, Methuselah's Pillar, The Renegade Writer, Time Trove, Blindsided, Ice Mummies, The Road to Forgiveness. Host of The Renegade Writer TV Show based on research for the books.

The Road to Forgiveness
In The Road to Forgiveness he recounts the death of his daughter and his mother-in-law, Janice Nicolich, in a drunk-driving accident on June 28, 1996.

Publications
 Malchus (2000) 
 The Road to Forgiveness (2001) 
 Driven (2002) 
 Takedown (2003) 
 Stingers
 Talons
 "Methuselah's Pillar" 
 "The Renegade Writer" (also the renegade writer TV show based on research for the books)
 "Time Trove" 
 "Blindsided" (with co-author Roschelle Salmon)
 "Ice Mummies"

References

Living people
21st-century American novelists
American memoirists
American male novelists
People from Long Island
20th-century American novelists
20th-century American male writers
21st-century American male writers
20th-century American non-fiction writers
21st-century American non-fiction writers
American male non-fiction writers
Year of birth missing (living people)